Watauga is an unincorporated community in Corson County, South Dakota, United States. Although not tracked by the Census Bureau, Watauga has been assigned the ZIP code of 57660.

Watauga is a name derived from the Sioux language meaning "foam".

References

Unincorporated communities in Corson County, South Dakota
Unincorporated communities in South Dakota